The Women's Sprint Tandem B1-3 cycling competition at the 2004 Summer Paralympics was held from 19 to 20 September at the Olympic Velodrome.

The event was won by Lindy Hou and her sighted pilot Janelle Lindsay, representing .

Results

Ranking Round

Competition bracket

Final Round

5-6 Place Match

References

W
Para